Maksim Sergeyevich Afonin (born 6 January 1992) is a Russian athlete specialising in the shot put. He competed at the 2018 World Indoor Championships as an Authorised Neutral Athlete due to Russia's ban from international competition.

His personal bests in the event are 21.07 metres outdoors (Moscow 2017) and 21.39 metres indoors (Moscow 2018).

International competitions

References

1992 births
Living people
Russian male shot putters
Authorised Neutral Athletes at the World Athletics Championships
Russian Athletics Championships winners